Lidia Alma Thorpe (born 18 August 1973) is an Australian independent politician. She has been a senator for Victoria since 2020 and is the first Aboriginal senator from that state. She was a member of the Australian Greens until February 2023 when she quit the party over disagreements concerning the proposed Indigenous Voice to Parliament. She had also served as the Greens' deputy leader in the Senate from June to October 2022.

Thorpe has previously been a member of the Victorian Parliament. On winning the Northcote state by-election on 18 November 2017 she became the first Aboriginal woman elected to the state's parliament and served as the member for the division of Northcote in the Legislative Assembly from 2017 to 2018.

Thorpe has received media attention for her criticism of the legitimacy of Australian political institutions, which she views as stemming from colonialism. She has been criticised for "aggressive behaviour" towards police. She has been critical of the Albanese Government's proposal for an Indigenous Voice to parliament.

In October 2022 she was forced to resign as Deputy Leader of the Greens in the Senate after failing to declare a relationship with a senior Rebels outlaw bikie gang member while serving on the Senate committee investigating bikie gangs.

Early life and education 
Lidia Alma Thorpe was born in 1973 in Carlton, Victoria. She is of European, DjabWurrung, Gunnai and Gunditjmara descent.

Thorpe grew up in Housing Commission flats in Collingwood and went to Gold Street Primary School in Clifton Hill. She studied Year 7 at Fitzroy High School, Year 8 at Collingwood High, returned to Fitzroy High for Year 9, but left soon afterwards, at the age of 14. She enjoyed playing Australian rules football and netball, and says that she was very competitive.

Her first job was working with her uncle Robbie Thorpe at the Koori Information Centre at 120 Gertrude Street, Fitzroy, which at that time was "a hub of Black political activity". She says that from that day onwards, she has worked continuously, apart from six-month breaks when having babies.

She holds a Diploma of Community Development from Swinburne University of Technology, a graduate certificate in public sector management and a Certificate IV Indigenous Leadership.

She became a single mother at the age of 17.

Early career
Thorpe has worked as the Aboriginal employment adviser for the Municipal Association of Victoria and was president of the Lakes Entrance Basketball Association for three years. She has also been a member of the school council of the Nowa Nowa Primary School, a steering committee for Indigenous administrators and the Institute of Public Administration Australia (Victoria). She worked as a project manager with the East Gippsland Shire Council, Indigenous manager at Centrelink and manager at Lake Tyers Aboriginal Training Centre.

Thorpe was the co-chair of the Victorian NAIDOC Committee from 2014 to 2017.

She said that her bankruptcy resulted from domestic violence, stating "like many survivors of family violence, I ended up losing everything in a bid to protect myself and my family from an impossible situation". Her ex-husband, who was an alcoholic, confirmed her account of the marriage breakdown. She was discharged from bankruptcy in 2016.

Political career

Victorian Legislative Assembly

Thorpe won the seat of Northcote at the 2017 by-election on 18 November 2017 after receiving 45.22% of the primary vote, which became 50.93% after the distribution of preferences, 11% more than the Labor candidate. She was sworn in as a member of parliament on 28 November 2017 and delivered her first speech to the assembly the following day.
Thorpe was the Australian Greens Victoria portfolio holder for Aboriginal Justice, Consumer Affairs, Skills and Training, Sport and Mental Health.

In May 2018, she organised an historic gathering of Aboriginal elders at the Parliament of Victoria to discuss the state's treaty processes. The meeting was organised as part of Thorpe's campaign to implement clan-based treaties, which would recognise the approximately 100 Aboriginal clans in Victoria. At the time, Thorpe said: "Our sovereignty and each of our language groups and our Clans must be clearly recognised in the government's treaty advancement legislation." The delegation of clan elders unanimously agreed to form an elders council. Thorpe supported the Victorian Government's 2018 treaty bill, but stated that she would continue to push for clan sovereignty to be recognised as the treaty process advances.

Thorpe lost her seat to Labor candidate Kat Theophanous at the 2018 Victorian state election, with her term finishing on 19 December 2018. She told ABC Radio Melbourne: "We need to have a good look at ourselves and have a review of what this election has done to our party, losing quite a considerable amount of Greens members." She said Labor ran a "dirty campaign" against her but conceded that negative coverage due to internal party scandals had also contributed to her defeat.

Senate

In June 2020, Thorpe was preselected by Victorian Greens members to fill the federal Senate vacancy caused by former leader Richard Di Natale's resignation. She was appointed to the vacancy at a joint sitting of the Victorian Parliament on 4 September and sworn in on 6 October 2020. She is the first Aboriginal woman to represent Victoria in the Senate and is the first Aboriginal federal parliamentarian from the Greens. 

In a speech to Parliament in May 2021, Thorpe commented negatively on new bail laws being introduced into the Northern Territory and made an assumption that the Attorney-General of the Northern Territory was a white male. The attorney-general, Selena Uibo, was an Aboriginal woman. Thorpe criticised the laws as racist, while Uibo countered that Thorpe simply said outrageous things to get on television and was not qualified to speak on the Northern Territory's issues.
 
In December 2021, Thorpe interjected to Liberal senator Hollie Hughes "at least I keep my legs shut", during a Senate discussion about people living with disabilities. When challenged on the remark, Thorpe told the Chamber: "I just got a view of something over there that disturbed me. But I’m happy to retract.” Hughes believed the statement was in reference to her autistic son, and was left in tears. Later in the evening, Thorpe admitted to "inappropriate remarks" and apologised, but denied any reference to Hughes's son.

In December 2021, following a fire that damaged the Old Parliament House in Canberra, Thorpe was criticised for tweeting "Seems like the colonial system is burning down. Happy New Year everyone #AlwayswasAlwayswillBeAboriginalLand". The tweet was criticised by members of both the Coalition and Australian Labor Party. Thorpe deleted the tweet an hour later.

Following the May 2022 federal election, at which she was re-elected, Thorpe was elected by the Greens party room as the party's deputy leader in the Senate.

In a June 2022 interview, Thorpe said she was there to 'infiltrate' the Australian parliament and that the Australian flag had "no permission to be here". Fellow Aboriginal senator Jacinta Nampijinpa Price denounced Thorpe's comments and called for her dismissal from parliament.

Thorpe gained media attention during her swearing-in ceremony, which was delayed due to her absence the week prior. She added the words "the colonising" in the required Oath of Allegiance to Queen Elizabeth II by saying "I swear by Almighty God that I will be faithful and bear true allegiance to the colonising Her Majesty Elizabeth the Second, Queen of Australia, Her heirs and successors according to law." Thorpe was immediately criticised by fellow senators. After an instruction by Labor Senate president Sue Lines and interjections from others that the oath must be taken word-by-word, Thorpe recited the pledge once more, this time omitting the two words.

Resignation from Greens' deputy leadership 
On 20 October 2022, Thorpe was forced to resign from her position as Greens' deputy leader in the Senate, shortly after ABC News revealed that in 2021 she had dated the ex-president of the Rebels outlaw bikie gang, Dean Martin. At the time of the relationship, she had held the justice portfolio for the Greens and had been serving on the joint parliamentary law enforcement committee, so had been privy to confidential briefings about bikie gangs and organised crime. Thorpe had not disclosed the relationship, and it was only revealed when her staff notified party leader Adam Bandt's office and an independent parliamentary authority. Her staff became aware of the relationship in mid-2021. In August 2021, when confidential law enforcement committee briefing documents concerning bikie gangs arrived in her office hours after Thorpe had met Martin, one of her staffers urged her to inform Bandt, but she failed to do so. She told the staffer that "she was being really careful": she used encrypted social media to communicate with Martin, conversations were deleted weekly, and they never met at either one's home. The matter was referred to the Australian Federal Police. Thorpe said that she continues to be friends with Martin. Martin had been president of the Rebels in Victoria, and had been charged and pleaded guilty to liquor offences in 2013. 

Following the revelations, Thorpe faced a censure motion in the Senate. Senator Pauline Hanson called for her to resign, while ALP senator Helen Polley, the head of the joint parliamentary law enforcement committee, of which Thorpe had been a member, said, with regard to Thorpe's position as a senator: "she should consider if it's the right place for her".

It was also reported on 20 October that following a complaint by one of her staff, the Department of Finance was reviewing the culture of Thorpe's office.

On 24 October, Thorpe referred herself to the Senate privileges committee. 

In March 2023 a parliamentary investigation cleared Thorpe of contempt of parliament.

Resignation from the Greens 
On 6 February 2023, Thorpe announced that she would resign from the Greens to become an independent senator, sitting on the crossbench, over disagreements concerning the proposed Indigenous Voice to Parliament. In a statement, Thorpe stated that "this country has a strong grassroots black sovereign movement, full of staunch and committed warriors, and I want to represent that movement fully in this Parliament. It has become clear to me, that I can't do that from within the Greens."

Ongoing roles and interests
Thorpe is or has been the delegate for the Lakes Entrance Aboriginal Education Consultative Group, the Victorian representative to the National Advisory Committee for The Smith Family and co-chair of the Victorian NAIDOC Committee.

Activism 
Thorpe has supported the Pay the Rent campaign, which calls on non-Aboriginal Australians to voluntarily pay reparations through an organisation of the same name. Thorpe has been critical of the Uluru Statement from the Heart, believing there should be a treaty before an Indigenous voice to government. Thorpe led a walk-out of the Uluru convention, believing that it was "hijacked by Aboriginal corporations and establishment appointments and did not reflect the aspirations of ordinary Indigenous people". On Australia Day 2019, an inaugural dawn service organised by Thorpe was held at the Kings Domain Resting Place as a day of mourning and reflection on the colonisation of Australia with Aboriginal and non-Aboriginal people in attendance for the ceremony. Thorpe was removed from the Sydney Gay and Lesbian Mardi Gras parade on 25 February 2023. She had laid down in front of a float in protest.

Award
Thorpe was awarded the Fellowship for Indigenous Leadership in 2008.

Personal life and family 
Thorpe's grandmother, Alma Thorpe, was one of the founders of the Victorian Aboriginal Health Service in 1973, the year of Lidia's birth, and was also involved in the setting up of the Aboriginal Tent Embassy. Her mother, Marjorie Thorpe, was a co-commissioner for the Stolen Generations inquiry that produced the Bringing Them Home report in the 1990s, and later a member of the Council for Aboriginal Reconciliation, and a preselected Greens federal candidate for Gippsland. Both Alma and her mother, Edna Brown, were Koori activists in Footscray and Collingwood. Edna had been forcibly moved out of Framlingham Aboriginal Reserve in 1932, aged 15, before becoming a community activist. Edna was married to James Brown, of Scottish/Australian descent.

Thorpe's sister is Meriki Onus, who co-founded the Warriors of Aboriginal Resistance (WAR) collective that was a driving force behind the Australian Aboriginal Sovereignty movement.

Her uncle is activist Robbie Thorpe, who is linked to some of the earliest struggles for Aboriginal Australian self-determination, and also involved with the Pay The Rent campaign.

Thorpe has three children and  has four grandchildren. 

According to October 2022 Facebook posts by Gavan McFadzen, manager of the Climate Change and Clean Energy Program at the Australian Conservation Foundation, he had been in a relationship with Thorpe since 2019. He wrote that he had only found out about her liaison with bikie Dean Martin via news media, referring to it as "an affair".

References

External links
IndigenousX

1973 births
Living people
Members of the Victorian Legislative Assembly
Australian Greens members of the Parliament of Victoria
Women members of the Australian Senate
Members of the Australian Senate
Members of the Australian Senate for Victoria
Indigenous Australian politicians
21st-century Australian women politicians
Australian indigenous rights activists
Women human rights activists
Women members of the Victorian Legislative Assembly
Australian Greens members of the Parliament of Australia
Australian socialists
Australian republicans
People from Collingwood, Victoria
Politicians from Melbourne
Gunaikurnai people